Gupabal Station is a station on the Seoul Subway Line 3. Some Line 3 trains only offer service up to this station, although it is not the technical end of Line 3 (Seoul Metro controlled section, Jichuk is the actual end). The name comes from 'Pabal', a Joseon-era post station that existed in the area. Nearby attractions include Jingwan Neighborhood Park, Gupabal Falls, Bukhansan National Park and Seooreung, a cluster of royal tombs. Lotte Mall, Eunpyeong NewTown and Eunpyeong Hanok village is near the station.

Station layout

References 

Metro stations in Eunpyeong District
Seoul Metropolitan Subway stations
Seoul Subway Line 3
Railway stations in South Korea opened in 1985